Dev is an Indian suspense drama television series produced by Peninsula Pictures. The series revolves around Dev Anand Burman, a detective battling inner demons. The crime stories are suggested by real-life cases.

The first season premiered on 5 August 2017. Ashish Chaudhary, Sumona Chakravarti and Pooja Bose played the lead roles in this season. The first season ended on 12 November 2017 after the planned 27 episodes and was replaced by Entertainment Ki Raat.

The second season began airing on 25 June 2018. Ashish Chaudhary, Amit Dolawat, Jigyasa Singh and Pooja Bose play the lead roles in this season.

Series overview

Plot
Detective Dev Anand Burman (Ashish Chaudhary) battles inner demons caused by the death of his wife Mahek. He has become a recluse but still works on criminal cases with Inspector Amod Narvekar. The Inspector believes that Dev murdered his own wife. Dev befriends his landlady Zohra Aapa who treats him like a son. Later, he meets fire-brand Meera who forces him to reassess his life.

Cast
 Ashish Chaudhary as Detective Dev Anand Burman
 Pooja Bose as Mehek Miranda Burman / Vaani Sahay
 Sumona Chakravarti as Meera Banerjee
 Amit Dolawat as Inspector Amod Narvekar
 Jayshree Arora as Zohra Rizvi
 Rajesh Khera as Arastu Sahay
 Surbhi Jyoti as Lawyer Fatima Hydari
 Sonal Vengurlekar as Pranali Saluja
 Mandar Jadhav as Ankit Saluja
 Neha Chowdhury as Janhvi Purohit
 Gauri Singh
 Vijay Badlani
 Atharva Vishwakarma as Avinash Malhotra alias Avi
 Jigyasa Singh as Dhwani Karchiwala
 Divyangana Jain as Kinjal Singhal
 Ayush Shrivastava as Bhaskar Tripathi

Controversy
The show was previously titled Dev Anand. However, after the family of the legendary actor Dev Anand sent a notice to the makers, they decided to rename the show.

Episodes

See also
List of Hindi thriller shows

References

2017 Indian television series debuts
Hindi-language television shows
Colors TV original programming
Indian crime television series
Fictional portrayals of the Maharashtra Police